The Mysterious Mr. M is a 1946 Universal Pictures movie serial, the 137th and last serial produced by Universal.

Plot
Anthony Waldron intends to steal a new submarine invention from Dr. Kittridge while blaming a fictitious mastermind he calls "Mr. M."  To further this plan, Waldron uses a mind control drug he has developed called "Hypnotreme."  However, a mystery villain soon appears claiming to be the real Mr. M and starts giving Waldron orders.

Federal agent Grant Farrell, whose brother was killed by Waldron, is dispatched to find the mysterious villain and stop his nefarious plans, teaming up with Kirby Walsh and Shirley Clinton to do so.

Cast
 Richard Martin as Detective Lieutenant Kirby Walsh 
 Pamela Blake as Shirley Clinton, insurance investigator
 Dennis Moore as Agent Grant Farrell
 Edmund MacDonald as Anthony Waldron, the original villain
 Virginia Brissac as Cornelia Waldron 
 Jack Ingram as William Shrag, the chief henchman
 Danny Morton as Derek Lamont, one of Waldron's henchmen
 Byron Foulger as Wetherby
 Jane Randolph as Marina Lamont, one of Waldron's henchmen
SOURCE:

Chapter titles
When Clocks Chime Death 
Danger Downward 
Flood of Flames 
The Double Trap 
Highway Execution 
Heavier than Water 
Strange Collision 
When Friend Kills Friend 
Parachute Peril 
The Human Time-bomb 
The Key to Murder 
High-line Smash-up 
The Real Mr. M
SOURCE:

See also
 List of film serials by year
 List of film serials by studio

References

External links

1946 films
1946 crime films
American black-and-white films
1940s English-language films
Universal Pictures film serials
Films directed by Lewis D. Collins
Films directed by Vernon Keays
American crime films
Films with screenplays by Joseph F. Poland
1940s American films